Phil Paul Thompson (born 1 April 1981) is a former English footballer who played in the Football League for Blackpool.

References

1981 births
Living people
English footballers
Association football defenders
English Football League players
People from Blackpool
Blackpool F.C. players
Squires Gate F.C. players